In enzymology, an initiation-specific alpha-1,6-mannosyltransferase is an enzyme that catalyzes the chemical reaction in which an alpha-D-mannosyl residue is transferred from GDP-mannose to a lipid-linked oligosaccharide, being linked by an alpha-1,6-D-mannosyl-D-mannose bond.

This enzyme belongs to the family of glycosyltransferases, specifically the hexosyltransferases.  The systematic name of this enzyme class is GDP-mannose:oligosaccharide 1,6-alpha-D-mannosyltransferase. Other names in common use include alpha-1,6-mannosyltransferase, GDP-mannose:oligosaccharide 1,6-alpha-D-mannosyltransferase, GDP-mannose:glycolipid 1,6-alpha-D-mannosyltransferase, and glycolipid 6-alpha-mannosyltransferase.  This enzyme participates in high-mannose type n-glycan biosynthesis.

References

 
 
 
 
 
 
 
 
 

EC 2.4.1
Enzymes of unknown structure